Lemmaphyllum is a genus of ferns in the family Polypodiaceae, subfamily Microsoroideae, according to the Pteridophyte Phylogeny Group classification of 2016 (PPG I).

Taxonomy
Lemmaphyllum was first described by Carl Presl in 1851. A molecular phylogenetic study in 2019 suggested that Lemmaphyllum was one of a group of closely related genera in the subfamily Microsoroideae; a group the authors termed "Lepisorus sensu lato".

Species
, the Checklist of Ferns and Lycophytes of the World recognized the following species:
Lemmaphyllum carnosum (Wall. ex J.Sm.) C.Presl
Lemmaphyllum diversum (Rosenst.) Tagawa
Lemmaphyllum drymoglossoides (Baker) Ching
Lemmaphyllum microphyllum C.Presl
Lemmaphyllum rostratum (Bedd.) Tagawa
Lemmaphyllum squamatum (A.R.Sm. & X.C.Zhang) Li Wang

Plants of the World Online also accepted Lemmaphyllum accedens (Blume) Donk, which the Checklist of Ferns and Lycophytes of the World placed in Lepisorus.

References

Polypodiaceae
Fern genera